The Perlenbach-Fuhrtsbachtal nature reserve is a 331 hectare reserve in the Aachen region, in the south west corner of North Rhine-Westphalia, Germany. It is characterised by fen vegetation and wet grassland zones with sedge and reed beds.
(two districts of Monschau) and thus forms part of the Monschauer-Hellentaler forest plateau.  The area includes two river valleys, the Perlenbach and Fuhrtsbach.

The reserve is noted for the daffodils that bloom there in the spring from late March to mid-May, a major tourist attraction. It is estimated that ten million native plants of Narcissus pseudonarcissus grow there.

Sources 

Nature reserves in Germany
Monschau
Narcissus (plant)